Kayla Blake (born Elsie Mapuana Sniffen; December 4, 1963) is an American actress. She is also credited as Elsie Sniffen. She is best known for the role of Kim on the ABC Television series Sports Night.

Career 
Blake starred on One West Waikiki (1994–1996) as Nui Shaw. Blake had a recurring role as Kim, an associate producer, in the television series Sports Night which lasted two seasons from 1998 to 2000. She has made minor guest appearances on other TV series, including Without a Trace, Fame, and in the recurring role of Trish on the CBS-TV soap opera series The Bold and The Beautiful, where she appeared in five episodes (1988–93).

She has also appeared in minor roles in films such as Lambada (1990), Basic Instinct (1992) and Four Christmases (2008).

Personal life 
She has been married to Robert Check since September 28, 2002.

Filmography

Film

Television

External links 
 

1963 births
American film actresses
Living people
Actors from Redondo Beach, California
21st-century American women